Haworthia mutica is a species of succulent plant native to South Africa's Cape Province. Very similar to, and often confused with, types such as Haworthia retusa, the species has blunt, triangular shaped leaves that are typically striated. In the wild it rarely offsets, though clones in cultivation may do so readily. The variety H. mutica var nigra is similar but with darker (nearly black) leaf color.

References

External links
 Haworthia mutica, blog post with further description
 

mutica
Flora of South Africa
Plants described in 1821